Halysidota intensa is a moth of the family Erebidae. It was described by Walter Rothschild in 1909. It is found in Guatemala, Costa Rica, Honduras, Colombia, Venezuela, Ecuador, Peru and Bolivia.

References

Halysidota
Moths described in 1909